Margherita "Rita" Sacchetto (15 January 1880 — 18 January 1959) was a German dancer, film actress, and screenwriter.

Early life
Margherita Sacchetto was born in Munich, in what was then the German Empire, on 15 January 1880. Her father was from Venice, and her mother was Austrian. She trained as a dancer in Munich.

Career

Sacchetto made her debut in 1905 at the Munich Künstlerhaus. Gustav Klimt and Koloman Moser designed the sets for her performance in 1906. She toured internationally from 1908 to 1910 with dancer Loie Fuller, including a show at the Metropolitan Opera in 1910, and a dance about women's suffrage set to the music of Edvard Grieg, performed at the New Theatre, also in 1910. She also ran a dance school in Berlin from 1916 to 1918, with students including Rahel Sanzara, Anita Berber, Hansi Burg, and Valeska Gert. Among her neighbors in Berlin was the scientist, Max Born, who recalled her as "a very beautiful woman" with "dazzling" students. 

She was known for developing a style called tanzbilder, which involved novel dance interpretations of great works of art, with remarkable costumes designed by Sacchetto herself. Caroline V. Kerr of Theatre magazine described Sacchetto in 1909 as "wholly human, of fascinating naiveté, captivating in her exuberance of temperament, in her grace and charm." Ben Ali Haggin painted Sacchetto's portrait in one of her best-known costumes, titled "En Crinoline". At the peak of her dance career, she was a frequent guest of European royalty, including Queen Margherita of Savoy, Nicholas II of Russia's family, and Alfonso XIII of Spain.

She appeared in several Danish and German silent films, under contract to Nordisk Film, between 1913 and 1917. In the United States, she was known for her appearance in The Ghost of the White Lady (1914), and In the Line of Duty (1914). She wrote one film, En Død i Skønhed (1915), in which she also appeared.

In 1924, Sacchetto was accidentally shot in the foot by one of her husband's friends. This resulted in her retiring to Poland.

Personal life
At age 37, Rita Sacchetto married the 24-year-old Polish nobleman and sculptor August Zamoyski on 5 May 1917, becoming the first of his four wives. Sacchetto died in 1959, in Nervi, Italy, three days after her 79th birthday.

References

External links
 
 
 Rita Sacchetto's listing on BFI

1880 births
1959 deaths
20th-century German dancers
German film actresses
20th-century German actresses
Actresses from Munich